Lisi Harrison's young adult novel series, The Clique revolves around the lives of five girls: Massie Block, Alicia Rivera, Dylan Marvil, Claire Lyons, and Kristen Gregory. Together they collectively make up The Pretty Committee, an Alpha clique at the fictional, all-girls middle school, Octavian Country Day. Claire Lyons is a misfit girl from Orlando, Florida who shops at GAP and tries to fit into the Pretty Committee. Massie is the head of the group, while Claire, a newcomer to the area, is initially considered an outcast due to her financial and fashion status. As the series progresses, she slowly develops a friendship with Massie and eventually becomes a member of the group.

The first novel, The Clique, was released on May 5, 2004. As of March 2010, the series spans fourteen full-length novels, and a five novella sub-series called the "Clique Summer Collection."

Characters

Massie Block 
Massie Block is a popular girl at Octavian Country Day (OCD), is alpha of the Pretty Committee, and is used to being the Top Alpha and idol of all the students, until Claire, a new girl from Orlando, moves to Westchester. Massie has brown hair, amber eyes, and expensive wardrobe.  She is described as wearing (the fictional) Chanel No. 9 every day and people often mistake her signature scent for Chanel No. 19.  On special occasions, she wears No. 5., while Chanel No. 19 is listed as her signature scent in "The Cliquetionary".

At first, Massie cannot stand Claire and decides to make her life miserable, and Claire doesn't understand why Massie doesn't like her, but Claire doesn't exactly think the best of Massie's friends, the PC (Pretty Committee). Massie sees Claire as a threat and is determined to stop her. Her lifelong struggle was to be the Top Alpha, or the Ruler. Claire responds by turning Massie's friends against her, thinking it was the only way to "fit in" and be the "popular girl" at school, to make everyone like and envy her. At the end of the second book, they finally become friends. Throughout tough times, Massie and Claire start to rely on each other. In the first book, Massie falls for Chris Abeley but discovers that he already has a girlfriend named Fawn. In the second book, Massie and Claire throw a Halloween party and they both really like a Briarwood boy named Cam Fisher.  In the third book, Massie finds out that Alicia started her own Clique and discovers Cam likes Claire, not her.

While dealing with Alicia, Massie starts liking Derrick Harrington, or Derrington, as the girls secretly call him. Her life is pure interesting, with Nina the boy-charmer, getting expelled from OCD in Lake Placid thanks to Dylan's mom and their teacher, losing the lead role in 'Dial L for Loser' to Claire, searching for the key to a secret room and not finding it first, getting Chris to fall for Skye Hamilton even though they were falling for each other, and designing the overflow trailers. Massie also falls for Dempsey, and finally, her perfect match, Landon Crane, who sort of becomes her boyfriend. Although Massie is known as the alpha, she is the one whom her friends have turned against the most often of the five girls. It has been stated throughout the series that Alicia Rivera is prettier than Massie, but Massie is known as being over-thinking, and overall "leader" of the Pretty Committee, making her the true alpha. In the book My Little Phony, Massie finds out that her parents have gone broke.Then Claire finds out.

But in the book "A Tale of Two Pretties" her dad gets a new job but she has to move away from the Pretty Committee to England. When this happens, Alicia  becomes the Alpha & Queen Bee, and Massie meets a new hottie, James, a brown-haired, British "Bawttie". Massie also loves making nicknames for LBRs (Losers Beyond Repair).  Massie is played by Elizabeth McLaughlin in the Clique film.

Alicia Rivera 
Alicia is a half Spanish beauty with black, glossy hair, and chocolate eyes. Alicia is boastful about her remarkably large breasts, but it's later revealed she actually has breast implants. She and Massie have different positions in the group; While Massie is the Top Alpha/Ruler, Alicia is portrayed as the beta. Massie is secretly envious of Alicia's good looks. Even though she is prettier than Massie, Massie holds supreme alpha status, which frustrates Alicia.

In 'Revenge of the Wannabes',she breaks free from the alpha's hold and decides to start her own clique with her light blonde haired, light blue eyed friend, Olivia Ryan. They are known as the Twenty by the Briarwood Boys, because the pair are perfect tens. However, their progress is slow, and they can only clasp hold on Strawberry, a  pink haired, soccer playing, slightly chubby girl, and dirty-blonde haired, bad postured girl, Kori. At the end of the book, at a Teen Vogue photo shoot, she and Massie make up, and Alicia dumps the LBRs (Loser Beyond Repair.) She also had a very large crush on Cam Fisher's sixteen-year-old brother, Harris.

Alicia develops a serious crush on a new Briarwood boy named Josh, right in time for her sexy cousin Nina to convince Alicia that he likes her, even though Josh is downright in love with Alicia.

When problems circulate throughout the whole Pretty Committee, the whole group is dumped by their boyfriends, except Alicia, who sees her hot boyfriend Josh Hotz behind Massie's back after she calls on a boy-fast. The whole crew deals with maintaining their alpha status when the Briarwood boys move into OCD, their girls-only private school. Alicia and Josh then start openly dating, and he ruins the atmosphere at her adult(ish) Couple's Dinner party in Boys R us. Alicia Rivera is played by Samantha Boscarino in the Clique film. Alicia wants to be a famous news reporter, or famous gossip anchor when she's an adult.

In 'A tale of Two Pretties' Massie's father loses his job, and the family becomes broke. The Block family moves to England, which make Alicia the: 'Top Alpha; Queen Bee'.

Dylan Marvil
Dylan Marvil has thick red hair, green eyes and is self-conscious about her weight. Her crush is Chris Plovert. She has a famous mother named Merri-lee Marvil, who is the host of a fictional show, The Daily Grind.

She also has 2 older sisters named Ryan and Jamie. In Best Friends Fornever, she and Kristen were fighting over Derrington. In Invasion of the Boy Snatchers, she and Kristen started kissing up to Nina Callas and she and Kristen were in a contest to see who ever kisses their crush first they'll get a pair of Nina's boots. In The Pretty Committee Strikes Back, her mom is a chaperone for their class field trip and her mom starts liking her teacher, Mr. Myner which was embarrassing.

In Dial L for Loser, she doesn't get to go to Hollywood because someone over heard her spill one of the movie star's secret.

In Sealed with a Diss, she is known for being the boyish one of The Pretty Committee from The Briarwood Boys and gains a few pounds for them to love her.

Kristen Gregory 
Kristen Michelle Gregory is the athlete and the genius of the Pretty Committee. She is good at making comebacks to mean comments. In books 1–3, she is obsessed with crossword puzzles, but switches to word jumbles in book 4. While she is part of the Pretty Committee, she hardly has any main plotlines revolving around her. She is very smart and attends Octavian Country Day school on a scholarship. It is revealed about halfway through the first book that Kristen is "poor", but she is really middle class.

The only way she was able to go to OCD was through a scholarship. She stands as the reason to the Pretty Committee, always at hand with a witticism or moral. While she has a tendency to switch to the winning side during fights, she proves to be a very loyal friend to the entire Pretty Committee. She loves to play soccer and is mistaken for a boy in the fourth book when her mom cuts all her hair off and she is forced to wear hats. It is revealed in the Kristen summer series book that she is the alpha of the "Witty Committee" which includes LBRs like Layne Abeley.

She has a crush on Dune, a cute surfer, but later develops a crush on Dempsey Solomon, her new neighbor, who is being fought over by Layne and Massie. In Boys R Us, they develop a relationship, which irritates both Massie and Layne. That was the first real fight between Massie and Kristen. She is described as having blonde hair and aqua blue eyes.

Kristen is played by Bridgit Mendler in the Clique film. In a pull out poster in the last book her plans for the future would be a soccer player. Bridget also plays on "Good Luck Charlie" as Teddy Duncan.

Claire Lyons
Claire Lyons is the “New Girl” of the Pretty Committee in the series. At the beginning of the series, Claire was teased constantly by the Pretty Committee, but was lucky enough to survived months and is now a new member. Claire moved from Orlando, Florida. In Invasion of the Boy Snatchers, it was announced that she and her family would be moving to Chicago, but they end up staying in the guest house. Not only that but in the book, it was revealed that Claire's full name is Claire Stacey Lyons. Now she lives in the Block's guesthouse and over the course of the series, has become very close friends with Massie.

In the beginning of the series she is somewhat innocent and naïve, but is forced to mature as the cruel treatment from the Pretty Committee causes her to become more aware of what people think of her. She is obsessed with her boyfriend, Cam Fisher (and his green eye) (no offence blue eye), despite their on/off relationship. In Dial L For Loser, Claire becomes a celebrity and must mature even more because of hateful treatment from Massie, Alicia, and her so-called celebrity friends at the end of the book. In the 9th book Claire becomes jealous of her ex-boyfriend's relationship with Olivia Ryan. Claire's parents are Jay and Judi Lyons, and her little brother is Todd. Claire has said in the past that she was ashamed of her parents for being slightly overweight and not dressing like the rest of the parents in Westchester, but she enjoys the fact that they don't make fun of her for eating junk food.

In It's Not Easy Being Mean Claire must choose between pursuing an acting career or staying in Westchester, and she then realizes how much Layne Abeley's friendship, Cam's admiration, and the Pretty Committee's membership means to her, so she decides to stay. Claire's first friend in Westchester is Layne Abeley, who becomes her best and only friend at school. As the year progresses, Claire forms friendships with Massie, Alicia, Dylan, and Kristen. Claire's appearance is described as pretty but in a plain sort of way, with blonde hair with bangs and blue-gray eyes.

Claire is played by Ellen Marlow in the Clique film. In a pull out poster in the last book her plans for the future would be a wife to Cam and a mother to their children.

Supporting characters

Layne Abeley
Layne Jane Abeley is one of Claire's friends outside of the Pretty Committee and the sister of Chris Abeley. Mostly known for her quirky habits, she has peculiar food obsessions and wears headgear to school adorned with light-up magnets and picking outfits that do not match. Rather than wearing designer clothing like most OCD girls do, she shops at the men's department at the Salvation Army. She is often the butt of the PC's jokes, much to Claire's dismay. When Claire is fighting with Massie, Layne always helps her laugh. Layne's other friends are Meena and Heather, two girls that share Layne's interests.
In P.S. I Loathe you  she has a huge crush on Dempsey Soloman, who Massie also likes. Layne is always having fun and doesn't care what other people think about her. She is also known to be Claire's go to friend when she is having boy or PC (Pretty Committee) trouble. She is also described as a LBR or called "Layme", "Slow Layne", and "Layne the Stain" by the Pretty Committee.
Layne Abeley is very brave, and does not care what other people think about her. In two of  the books, Layne and Massie become BFFs.

Todd Lyons 
Todd Lyons is Claire's ten-year-old brother. He has curly red hair, but in the movie he has black hair. He likes spying and once put a camera in Massie's shower. He was Massie's first lip kiss, much to her dismay. Massie may also like Todd a bit, because of the way she talked to Todd at the end of Revenge of the Wannabes. Todd has also been kissed by Alicia on the cheek, but he likes Massie better, because he thinks Massie is perfect. Todd is played by Dylan Minnette in the Clique film.

Cam Fisher 
Cam first appears in the second novel, and is Claire Lyons' on again off again boyfriend. In the first few books, he is said to have black hair and two different colored eyes (one blue and one green). Massie initially had a crush on Cam, but after she learned he liked Claire she gave up on him. Initially Cam and Claire "date" by exchanging emails and Cam sending her gifts through her younger brother. When Cam begins avoiding her unexpectedly for weeks, Claire kisses Josh Hotz thinking Cam has broken up with her. Cam forgives her, only after sharing a kiss with Alicia Rivera. Later Claire begins spying on him when she suspects he is cheating. Innocent of the charge, and annoyed by her actions, he breaks up with her and begins dating Olivia.  He later breaks up with Olivia, asks Claire to forgive him, and they begin dating again. It is also known that Dylan and Alicia met him before meeting each other at the New Year's Eve Party hosted by Dylan Marvil's mom Merri-Lee Marvil, in Charmed and Dangerous, the rise of the Pretty Committee. Cam is described as having dark hair and one blue eye and one green eye. Cam is also described to be Derrick Harrington's best friend and not quite as rich as his friends. Cam's brother is Harris.

Derrick Harrington 
More often referred to as "Derrington' throughout the novels, Derrick appears prominently in Invasion of the Boy Snatchers, The Pretty Committee Strikes Back, Sealed with a Diss, Revenge of the Wannabes, P.S. I Loathe You, Best Friends for Never and Bratfest at Tiffany's. Derrick is described to have shaggy blonde hair, big caramel eyes and to overall remind people of a golden lab. He's said to be the boy alpha as well as best friend to Cam Fisher. Derrick acts as a dramatic foil for Massie, starting out as her friends' crush, then her crush, then her boyfriend and, eventually, her ex-boyfriend. Derrick seems to be the only boy that Massie gets nervous around. He is described as having various quirks, including wearing shorts all the time, even in winter, wiggling and flashing his butt after scoring a goal and referring to most people, even Massie, by their last names. Massie and Derrick's relationship is foreshadowed in the third book, but it is fully revealed in the fourth one. After Nina Callas convinces Massie that Derrick likes her (Nina) and not Massie, Massie ignores him. After Nina is thrown out of OCD, Massie and Derrick talk and they make up. Massie gives Derrick her "M" brooch, which he continues to wear well into the fifth book. In The Pretty Committee Strikes Back Massie, through a series of lies to the other girls she is "tutoring" to kiss, unintentionally leads Derrick to believe that she has been seeing someone else. He confronts her and she apologizes. They kiss and make up once again and it seems as if their relationship is good and well. However, he breaks up with Massie in book 8, because he has an "issue" with her. He later tells her he's into older girls because they're more "mature". He also thinks Massie is dating Chris Abeley, Layne's older brother because she spends a lot of time with Chris. This is because for the key to the secret room (bomb shelter where alpha eighth graders hang out) from 8th grade alpha Skye Hamilton, Massie has to get Chris to like Skye. If Massie doesn't hook up Skye with Chris, the PC doesn't get access to the bomb shelter at all, thus destroying their hopes of their 8th grade alpha status. In the ninth book, Derrick changes his style, (i.e. wearing jeans for the first time) but Massie becomes interested in Dempsey Solomon, a once LBR. In P.S. I Loathe You, Derrick confesses to Dylan, to whom he has taken a slight interest, that he only wore shorts because he had lost a bet & that he didn't like the nickname "Derrington". In the same book, he starts dating Dylan. Also he was mentioned along with Cam Fisher in Charmed and Dangerous: The Rise of the Pretty Committee. Derrick and Cam are implied to be best friends. In These Boots Are Made For Stalking, Dylan and Derrick (sort of) break up, because she was disgusted that he lost a bet and had to wear all his clothes backward for the rest of the year.  In A Tale of Two Pretties''', Derrick is mentioned many times throughout all the girls POV's even though he's only briefly in the beginning of the book.
He also wants to crush Massie's status in Bratfest at Tiffany's but he was not ever really showed to do any anything to do threaten her.

 Josh Hotz 
Josh Hotz first appears in the fourth novel. Alicia sees him as a potential crush and begins to gather information on him. She learns that he is not an exchange student from Hotchkiss Academy as the principal told everyone, but, rather, he was expelled after pulling a fire alarm before a major test. He is on the soccer team, as many of the Pretty Committee's crushes are, and is described to be a preppy Ralph Lauren lover and enjoys gossip, like Alicia. He remains relatively unseen in Invasion of the Boy Snatchers, only appears three times in the entire book, but he is featured more prominently in Bratfest at Tiffany's. At the end of Invasion of the Boy Snatchers Claire Lyons kisses him because Cam Fisher was ignoring her. He is led to believe that Claire genuinely likes him and seems somewhat hurt when Claire gets back together with Cam. In Dial L For Loser, Josh shows that he likes Alicia back by giving her daisies. Little is seen of him in It's Not Easy Being Mean and he reappears at the end of Sealed with a Diss after attending Skye Hamilton's Famous Couples party with Alicia as Ralph and Ricky Lauren. In Bratfest at Tiffany's Josh and Alicia secretly begin dating even though Massie's boy-fast prohibits the Pretty Committee girls from dating. When Massie finds out that they are still dating, Alicia gets mad, saying he was the first boy who liked her who she actually was, not because they simply thought she was really hot. At the end of "Bratfest at Tiffany's" Massie calls off the boy-fast. They are still going strong in Boys R Us. In These Boots Are Made For Stalking, they (sort of) break up again(because Alicia was disgusted that Josh had the same, if not smaller, clothing size as her.) It is unknown if they get back together again, but in 'A Tale of Two Pretties' there was a brief mention of him in Alicia's POV, implying that they still like each other.

Dempsey Solomon
Dempsey Solomon is a friend and crush of Layne's. When he was considered a "loser", he was called "Humpty Dempsey" by Massie because he was overweight. Over the summer, he and his parents went to Africa to help rebuild houses, during which he lost weight and got a tan. Massie crushes on him in book 9, despite the rules of her own "boyfast". Claire uses him to "jealousy-flirt" so she can get Cam Fisher back, again despite the boyfast. He was the role model for the LBR guys in the overflow trailers when Massie was giving them make-overs. At the end, Massie ends up liking him so much that she ends her own "boyfast". In P.S I Loathe You,  both Layne (Kristen's Secret Best Friend) and Massie ask Kristen to find out who he likes, as they are neighbors. Dempsey reveals that he likes Kristen, and in Boys R Us, they begin to date. He ends up joining the soccer team and befriends his team members. In These Boots Are Made For Stalking they (sort of) break up, though in 'A Tale Of Two Pretties', Dempsey visits Kristen at Christmas, in which she is very glad to see him, implying they still like each other.

Landon Crane
Landon Crane is a 9th-grade high schooler who goes to ADD, the local public school. He has messy black wavy hair, blue-green eyes that seem to change color, one dimple, and a puppy named Bark Obama. He and Massie met in Boys R Us at her Ho Ho Homeless Charity Drive/ Fashion Show. They immediately like each other. At first, Massie is unsure how much she likes him, as she had bad experiences with boys, having had Derrington and Dempsey taken away from her. In "These Boots Are Made For Stalking", she seems to be almost obsessed with him, stalking and spying on him. Massie's dog, Bean, likes Bark Obama a lot too, licking his picture and such.  His mom, Celia Crane, is the pet boutique owner of 'Bark Jacobs'. His family is very rich, about the same as Massie's. Massie later says that Landon was probably the first boy she ever actually liked for him, not his status or his looks(even though he was pretty popular and very good looking). She also says that he had everything she had ever wanted in a guy, good fashion sense, in high school, a puppy, etc. In A Tale of Two Pretties, Hermia, the psychic tells Massie that even though he is really great, he is not the guy for her. When Massie moves to England, they have a heart-to-heart conversation about whether it would be realistic having a transnational relationship. They decide to stay as friends, as Massie later puts, she thinks they will always be, only just friends.

Skye Hamilton 
Skye Hamilton is an 8th grade alpha who first appears in It's Not Easy Being Mean with her own clique, the DSL Daters, so named for their rapid connecting with boys. Her parents, including her famous-dancer mother, own the Body Alive Dance Studio. She herself adores dancing - and performing. She has bangle bracelets on her wrist, one for each boy she has kissed. She is beautiful with wavy blonde hair and turquoise eyes. Skye Hamilton becomes one of the main characters in Harrison's spin-off series, "Alphas".

Olivia Ryan
Olivia Ryan is Alicia's friend from dance class, and is often referred to as "Duh-Livia" for her ditzy nature, and "Faux-Livia" because she likes to buy cheap knock-offs like fake Louis Vuitton scarves. Everyone finds Alicia prettier than Olivia but in a less obvious way. When Olivia and Alicia attempt to form their own clique, it is she who recruits Kori and Strawberry. She later steals Cam from Claire, but Cam soon dumps Olivia because of her ditziness. She also constantly gets nose jobs. She is beautiful with her buttery blonde waves, navy eyes and a perfect body, and would be a no-brainer for Massie's clique if they didn't have a "No air head" policy.

Nina Callas
She came into the book Invasion of the Boy Snatchers. A year older than the Pretty Committee (13), she grabbed the sight of many Briarwood boys with her D-cups, boots, and body. She led Claire, Alicia, and Massie to think their crushes were in love with her and not them. In Invasion Of The Boy Snatchers, Nina told Cam Fisher, Derrington, and Josh Hotz about a "Spanish Spell" that would help them win their soccer finals, that meant if they stayed away from the girls (Claire, Massie, and Alicia) they would win their soccer match.
The OCD girls loved Nina's fashion, but it turned out she was a thief and had stolen her looks (clothes) from her sisters, Celia and Isobel, as well as various items from the girls at OCD. She is only in two of the books: Invasion of the Boy Snatchers and The Clique Summer Collection: Alicia''.
Nina is pitied upon by Alicia.

It is said that as a punishment for stealing her sister's boots they made her dye her hair platinum gold and cut it to match Dora's hairstyle.

James
James is a British boy, about the same age as Landon, with wavy black hair, dimples, and penny brown eyes. Massie and James met on the airplane to England. He is probably the boy the psychic Hermia predicted would end up with Massie (she said that she sees changes with a boy named James, not Landon). He is said to be going to KISS school in England, the same school Massie is going to attend.

References

characters
Clique